Mwanza is a city in northwest Tanzania.

Mwanza may also refer to:

People
 Mwanza Mukombo (1945–2001), Congolese footballer
 Billy Mwanza (born 1983), Zambian footballer
 Humphrey Mwanza (1949–2015), Zambian politician
 Leckford Mwanza Thotho (fl. 2009–2011), Malawian politician
 Peter Mwanza (born 1937), Malawian politician
 Pearson Mwanza (1968–1997), Zambia footballer
 Richard Mwanza (1959−1993), Zambian footballer

Places

Malawi
 Mwanza, Malawi, a town in southwestern Malawi
 Mwanza District, Southern Region, Malawi

Tanzania
 Mwanza, Tanzania
 Mwanza Region, Tanzania
 Mwanza Gulf, a gulf of Lake Victoria; see MV Mwanza
 Roman Catholic Archdiocese of Mwanza, Tanzania
 Mwanza Airport, outside Mwanza, Tanzania

Other uses
 MV Mwanza, a Lake Victoria ferry

See also
 Mwanza flat-headed rock agama, a lizard
 Mwanza frog (Xenopus victorianus)
 
Zambian surnames
Zambian given names
Given names of the Democratic Republic of the Congo
Surnames of the Democratic Republic of the Congo
Malawian surnames